Frank Brenner Morrison (May 20, 1905 – April 19, 2004) was an American politician and attorney who served as the 31st governor of Nebraska from 1961 to 1967, representing the Democratic Party.

Early life and education 
Morrison was born in Golden, Colorado, and attended high school in Manhattan, Kansas. He graduated from Kansas State University in 1927. Accepting an invitation from an aunt, he moved to Lincoln, Nebraska and attended the University of Nebraska College of Law and earned a law degree in 1931.

Career 
Morrison began his career as a teacher, and was superintendent of schools in Farwell, Nebraska before establishing his legal practice in Stockville, Nebraska. He was elected Frontier County attorney in 1934.

Morrison was a delegate to the Democratic National Convention in 1940, and chair of the Frontier County Democratic Party the same year.

He ran for the U.S. House of Representatives twice in 1948 and 1954 and United States Senate in 1958, 1966 and 1970 but lost all five elections. He was defeated by Roman L. Hruska in 1958 and 1970 and Carl T. Curtis in 1966.

Morrison secured the Democratic nomination for Governor of Nebraska and won the general election in 1960. He won reelection in 1962 and also in 1964. During his governorship, he worked to improve the University, particularly the scientific research and the agricultural departments, a state employees' retirement plan was initiated, a state income tax was sanctioned, and the state's accounting system was restructured. He signed legislation for Educational Television which led to the establishment of the statewide public television network, an act he said was his most important.

After leaving office, Morrison was appointed in 1968 as food consultant for the U.S. Agency for International Development in India. From 1971 to 1974 he was the Douglas County public defender.

Morrison was the driving force behind the construction of the Great Platte River Road Archway Monument in Kearney, Nebraska. A bust of his face can be seen at the entrance to the monument. The Great Platte River Road Archway Monument gained fame by being featured in the movie About Schmidt with Jack Nicholson. On July 16, 2000, he dedicated the 50,000 square-foot building that arches over Interstate 80.

Morrison wrote an autobiography, My Journey Through the Twentieth Century in 2001. He was a confidant of both Lyndon B. Johnson and John F. Kennedy, and was summoned to the White House immediately after JFK was assassinated.

Personal life
He married Maxine Elizabeth Hepp in 1936 and they had three children, Frank Jr, David Jon, and Jean Marie.

Morrison died in 2004 of cancer in the McCook Community Hospital, McCook, Nebraska, one month short of his 99th birthday. He was cremated.

His son, Frank B. Morrison Jr. (1937–2006) was a justice of the Montana Supreme Court. His grandson, John Morrison, is a former State Auditor of Montana and was a 2006 Senate candidate.

See also
List of governors of Nebraska

References

External links
Deathwatch Central
National Governors Association
The Political Graveyard

}

1905 births
2004 deaths
20th-century American politicians
Democratic Party governors of Nebraska
Nebraska lawyers
School superintendents in Nebraska
People from Golden, Colorado
People from Frontier County, Nebraska
People from Howard County, Nebraska
Kansas State University alumni
University of Nebraska College of Law alumni
Politicians from Manhattan, Kansas
Writers from Colorado
Writers from Nebraska
Writers from Manhattan, Kansas
Educators from Nebraska
20th-century American lawyers
Public defenders